Umberto Pirilli (born 25 September 1940 in Gioia Tauro)
is an Italian politician; he was
Member of the European Parliament
for Southern
with the Alleanza Nazionale, part of the Union for a Europe of Nations and
sits on the European Parliament's Committee on Industry, Research and Energy.

He was a substitute for the Committee on Foreign Affairs and a member of the
Delegation to the EU-Bulgaria Joint Parliamentary Committee.

In 2009 he was not re-elected.

Career
 Secondary school-leaving certificate in classical subjects and degree in law
 Publicist
 lecturer in civil law
 Professor of banking law at the Faculty of Statistics
 Professor of comparative private law at the Faculty of Business Studies of the University of Messina
 Lawyer dealing with civil cases
 Chairman of the FUAN of Messina
 Deputy national Youth Secretary for the MSI
 Municipal Councillor of Messina
 Member of the Municipal Council of Gioia Tauro
 Chairman of the Provincial Council of Reggio Calabria
 AN regional coordinator for Calabria
 Member of the Regional Executive and Substitute Chairman of the State-Regions Conference
 Chairman of the Conference of Regions and Local Authorities

See also
 2004 European Parliament election in Italy

External links
 
 

1940 births
Living people
People from Gioia Tauro
National Alliance (Italy) MEPs
MEPs for Italy 2004–2009
21st-century Italian politicians
National Alliance (Italy) politicians
Academic staff of the University of Messina